The 2010 Trofeo Paolo Corazzi was a professional tennis tournament played on outdoor hard courts. It was part of the 2010 ATP Challenger Tour. It took place in Cremona, Italy between May 17 and May 23, 2010.

ATP entrants

Seeds

Rankings are as of May 10, 2010.

Other entrants
The following players received wildcards into the singles main draw:
  Bernard Tomic
  Matteo Trevisan
  Grigor Dimitrov
  Giuseppe Menga

The following players received entry from the qualifying draw:
  Marius Copil
  Denis Gremelmayr
  Matthias Bachinger
  Rogério Dutra da Silva

Champions

Singles

 Denis Gremelmayr def.  Marius Copil, 6–4, 7–5

Doubles

 Alexander Peya /  Martin Slanar def.  Rik de Voest /  Izak van der Merwe, 7–5, 7–5

References
Official website
ITF search

Trofeo Paolo Corazzi
Trofeo Paolo Corazzi